Cham Mehr-e Pain (also Romanized as Cham Mehr-e Pā‘īn; also known as Cham-e Mehr) is a village in Jayedar Rural District, in the Central District of Pol-e Dokhtar County, Lorestan Province, Iran. At the 2006 census, its population was 719, in 147 families.

References 

Towns and villages in Pol-e Dokhtar County